Galician Nationalist Convergence (CNG, Converxencia Nacionalista Galega in Galician language) was a political coalition and, later, a political party in Galicia formed by Galician Coalition and Centrists of Galicia. CNG presented lists to the local elections of 1991. After the 1991 elections Centrist of Galicia abandoned the coalition and entered the People's Party of Galicia. This, and the bad electoral results, caused a crisis in Galician Coalition, which led to the split of CNG in the provinces of Ourense and Lugo. CNG, now an independent party, presented lists in the local elections of 1995, gaining only the 0.59% of the vote. The disastrous results of the local elections of 1999 led to the dissolution of the party and the founding of Galician Initiative.

Election results

References

Sources
 Beramendi, J. and Núñez Seixas, O Nacionalismo Galego, Edicións A Nosa Terra, Vigo, 1995.
 Various Authors, A Gran Historia de Galicia XIV: A Galicia autónoma (Dende a Transición), Edicións Arrecife, A Coruña, 2007.

Political parties in Galicia (Spain)
Liberal parties in Spain
Galician nationalist parties